Risa may refer to:

 Risa (given name), a feminine given name
 Risa (Star Trek), a fictional planet
 Radioiodinated serum albumin
 Recording Industry of South Africa
 Ribosomal Intergenic Spacer analysis

See also
 
 
 Rise (disambiguation)
 Riza (disambiguation)